Socotra Rock, also known as Ieodo or Suyan Islet, is a submerged rock  below sea level (at low tide) located in the Yellow Sea. International maritime law stipulates that a submerged rock outside of a country's territorial sea (generally 12 nautical miles) cannot be claimed as territory by any country. However, the rock is the subject of a maritime dispute between China and South Korea, which consider it to lie within their respective exclusive economic zones.

The rock serves as the foundation for Korean Ieodo Ocean Research Station. A Korean helipad is also located there to allow the research station to be serviced.

Names
In Korean, the rock itself is known as Ieodo or Parangdo. Internationally it is known as Socotra Rock, and in Chinese, it is known as Suyan Islet, which means the "rock" (岩/巖, yán) or "reef" (礁, jiāo) outside the coastal waters of Jiangsu (苏/蘇, sū, the abbreviation).

History

Both "Parangdo" and "Ieodo" are names for the mythical island which the residents of Jeju Island believed housed the spirits of fishermen who perished at sea. The South Korean government has asserted a direct connection between these legends and the modern-day rock, claiming that the traditional saying that "One who sees Parangdo would never return" refers to the danger facing sailors when high waves allow the rock to break the surface.

Koreans even name the studies about Ieodo as "Ieodology".
Socotra Rock's Korean name was officially designated as "Ieodo" on 26 January 2001, by the Korea Institute of Geology.

Timeline
1900: Socotra Rock is discovered by the British merchant vessel SS Socotra.
Vice Admiral Archibald Day, however, wrote in his book The Admiralty Hydrographic Service, 1795 - 1919 that this survey was 1901 not 1910.
1938: The Japanese government surveys the rock. Plans are laid for a research station, but are cut short by the outbreak of World War II.
1951: A joint team of the Republic of Korea Navy and the Korea Mountain Climbing Association reaches the rock and lowers a bronze marker bearing the legend "Ieodo, Territory of the Republic of Korea" ("대한민국 영토 이어도") onto its surface.
1952: South Korea promulgates the Syngman Rhee Line, which defined the country's territorial waters as including Socotra Rock. This was not recognised by the People's Republic of China or other neighbouring countries.
1963: Yuejin shipwreck: The Chinese vessel Yuejin sinks on her maiden voyage en route from Qingdao to Nagoya after being struck by an underwater object. The crew of the ship claimed to have been attacked by a torpedo, causing an international affair. It was later found that due to a navigational error by the crew, the "Yuejin" had actually struck Socotra Rock which was marked on navigational charts at the time. This was not recognized by the Koreas or other neighboring countries.
1970: South Korea's Underwater Resource Development Law was enacted, defining Socotra Rock to lie within the country's fourth mining field. This move was not recognised by the PRC. 
1984: The rock's location is confirmed by a research team from Cheju National University. 
1987: A warning beacon is placed on the rock by South Korea.
1992: Chinese Navy surveyed the Socotra Rock completely for the first time.
1995-2001: the Republic of Korea builds the Ieodo Ocean Research Station on Socotra Rock despite the objections from People's Republic of China. Several overflights of the area have since been made by the PRC surveillance aircraft.
2001: the Korea Institute of Geology officially designates the rock as "Ieodo" on 26 January 2001.

Dispute
According to the United Nations Convention on the Law of the Sea, a submerged reef can not be claimed as territory by any country.  However, China and South Korea dispute which is entitled to claim it as part of the Exclusive Economic Zone (EEZ).

In September 2006, the Chinese Foreign Ministry spokesman Qin Gang stated that China regarded South Korea's "unilateral" activities in the region, referring to Korean scientific observatories on Socotra, to be "illegal", but that there was no "territorial dispute"; no islands were mentioned. In a 2013 clarification, China stated that it had no dispute with Korea over the issue.

See also
East China Sea EEZ disputes
Foreign relations of the People's Republic of China
Foreign relations of the Republic of Korea
Liancourt Rocks
Parangcho
Parangdo (disambiguation)
Senkaku Islands dispute

References

External links
 Google earth Socotra Rock placemark download
 Ieodo Ocean Research Station

Disputed waters
Territorial disputes of South Korea
Territorial disputes of China
Landforms of Jeju Province
Landforms of Jiangsu
China–South Korea relations
Landforms of South Korea
Reefs of the Pacific Ocean
Landforms of the Yellow Sea
Individual rocks